Mark Twain State Park is a public recreation area encompassing  on Mark Twain Lake in Monroe County, Missouri. The state park offers water recreation, hiking trails, and campgrounds. It is adjacent to the Mark Twain Birthplace State Historic Site.

The Mark Twain State Park Picnic Shelter at Buzzard's Roost is a historic picnic shelter located at Mark Twain State Park. The shelter was built about 1941 by an all African-American Civilian Conservation Corps company. The shelter is constructed of stone in a rustic style. It was listed on the National Register of Historic Places in 1985.

References

External links

Mark Twain State Park Missouri Department of Natural Resources
Mark Twain State Park Map Missouri Department of Natural Resources

State parks of Missouri
Protected areas of Monroe County, Missouri
Protected areas established in 1924
1924 establishments in Missouri
Mark Twain
Park buildings and structures on the National Register of Historic Places in Missouri
Buildings and structures in Monroe County, Missouri
National Register of Historic Places in Monroe County, Missouri